Ukrainians in France are citizens of Ukraine who have migrated to France. According to INSEE, the Ukrainian population of France was 24,700 in 2017.

Refugees from Russian invasion of Ukraine
Following the 2022 Russian invasion of Ukraine, Ukrainian refugees started to arrive in France. By 8 March, it was reported that almost 5,000 refugees had arrived in the country. On 10 March, the Interior Ministry reported that 7,251 people had arrived in France from Ukraine, 6,967 of whom were Ukrainian nationals.

Notable People with Ukrainian ancestry

See also
 France–Ukraine relations
 Ukrainian Youth Association France, a scouting organization

References

External links
 Welcoming Ukrainian citizens in France Official Site of French State
 Franco-Ukrainian Association

Ethnic groups in France
France
 
Ukrainians in France